The 2nd MGP Nordic was held in Stockholm, Sweden in November 2006. This was the first time in four years that MGP Nordic took place after Denmark, Swedish broadcaster SVT, and Norway pulled out of the Junior Eurovision Song Contest that same year as a protest against the excess pressure put on the singers. Sweden did, however, compete at Junior Eurovision with different contestants and TV4 as the broadcaster from 2006 to 2009 despite withdrawing in 2008.

Organization
Following all three countries' withdrawal from the Junior Eurovision Song Contest, MGP Nordic was revived after a three-year hiatus but with minor changes. Jury voting was removed and one song from each country moved on to the super final and were performed again. The overall winner reprised their song at the end while the credits rolled.

National selections
 Norway decided: 22 April 2006
 Denmark decided: 16 September 2006
 Sweden decided: 6 October 2006

Participants

Denmark
 Foz'n's, aged 13 to 15 at the time of the contest, is made of lead singer Mark Fosnæs and backing dancers Mie Ranum and Karina Fosnæs; the latter is Mark's sister. "Mit mood" was written by Mark himself.
 WeMix has two boys and two girls, all aged 11 to 15 during the contest. The group is made of rappers Simon Opalka and Rami El-Daoud with sisters Sofie and Amalie Jacobsen as backing dancers. This is not to be confused with the now-extinct online music creation community of the same name, which launched in 2008.
 SEB is a pop-rock band featuring lead singer and guitarist Sebastian Nielsen, bassist Magnus Kaiser, and drummer Mathias Okholm.

Norway
 Drops is a singing duo featuring Fride Amundsen and Christine Nesøen.
 Not much is known about then-15-year-old Sondre Pettersen or his song "Tatt".
 Ole Runar Gillebo was born in early spring 1996 and lives in Kyrksæterøra. "Fotball e supert" is about his love for football.

Sweden
 Benjamin Ingrosso was born in September 1997 and lives in Danderyd, near Stockholm. "Hej Sofia" is about an Italian girl who Benjamin has a crush on and flies over to Italy to see her. Ingrosso later represented Sweden in the Eurovision Song Contest 2018 with the song "Dance You Off".
 Sanna Martinez-Matz was born in May 1996 and lives in Alnön. "Genom skog, berg, och hav" is about embarking on an important mission to find a missing diamond.
 MaDe is a duo containing Mathilda Glansk and Sara Denise Colbrand. Although "Inga känslor kvar" was written by the girls themselves, not much is known about the lyrical content.

Results

First round

Super Final

Voting

Notes

References 

2006 in Swedish music
MGP Nordic
2006 in Danish television
2006 in Norwegian music
2006 in Swedish television
2006 song contests
2006 in Norwegian television
2006 in Danish music